The Mount Everest Webcam (EWC) was activated by the EVK2Minoprio Organization at the same time as the COP 27- 2022
The webcam capture video footage of the summit of Mount Everest and is the highest webcam in the world. It was installed for the first time by Italian scientists as part of the EvK2CNR / NAST Piramide Observatory Laboratory project, which had and aims to collect scientific information and data on climate change, in particular as regards the physics and chemistry of atmosphere, the study of the evolution of glaciers, water and related phenomena, human health, vegetation and fauna in the Everest region, research related to seismic, geology and geophysics. Projects related to territorial development and capacity building are also active.
After a period of a few years with a reduced operation, the Pyramid Observatory Lobaoratory restarts its rebirth by restoring its meteorological stations and symbolically, on the occasion of the opening of COP27, activating a Webcam and turning on the unique and formidable vision of EVEREST, the roof of the world, as a sign of environmental hope. 
SCIENTIFIC AMERICAN: "Observatory on Mount Everest Must Be Saved, Scientists Say 
A research facility halfway up Mount Everest is crucial for research on climate change and biodiversity". 
WMO: "I would like express WMO appreciation of the intention  the re-opening of this station, within its sphere of influence, as a unique facility of global importance". 
As of 2022, the camera started again operating.

Features
The camera is an M12-type model made by the German-based company Mobotix. The M12-type camera is powered by solar cells and operated from 6am to 6pm local time (UTC +5:45).

Operation
The EWC operation support climatic data stored by Kala Pattar advanced automatic weather station (AAWS) designed and produced by Lsi-Lastem Italy.

The live video is analyzed in the observatory, then sent to Italy for further processing.

Last images are given daily as of december 2022.

Location
Kala Patthar was chosen as the location for the webcam because of its excellent view of the summit of Mount Everest, including both the north and south-west faces as well as the west ridge.

Highest webcam
As of December, 2022, it is the highest webcam in the world.

References

External links
Dawn to Dusk timelapse
https://mountaingenius.org/webcam-everest/

Mount Everest
Webcams